Clifton Pondexter (born September 15, 1954) is an American former professional basketball player.

A 6'9" power forward from Fresno, California, Pondexter starred at San Joaquin Memorial High School with his brother Roscoe. At the conclusion of his college career at California State University, Long Beach, Pondexter was selected by the Chicago Bulls with the sixteenth pick of the 1974 NBA draft and by the San Diego Conquistadors in the first round of the 1974 ABA Draft. Pondexter's NBA career was delayed by a stress fracture in his leg he suffered in the summer of 1974; he did not make his professional debut until a fall 1975 exhibition game against the Kentucky Colonels.

Between 1975 and 1978, Pondexter played 197 games for the Bulls. His best season was 1975-76, when he averaged 5.8 points and 5.1 rebounds per game. He never fully bounced back from his injury, however, and was waived by the Bulls in the summer of 1978. He then took his career to Europe.

Pondexter's nephew, Quincy Pondexter, was selected by the New Orleans Hornets in the first round of the 2010 NBA Draft.

References

1954 births
Living people
African-American basketball players
American expatriate basketball people in France
American expatriate basketball people in Israel
American expatriate basketball people in Italy
American men's basketball players
Basketball players from California
Centers (basketball)
Chicago Bulls draft picks
Chicago Bulls players
Long Beach State Beach men's basketball players
Parade High School All-Americans (boys' basketball)
Power forwards (basketball)
San Diego Conquistadors draft picks
Sportspeople from Fresno, California
Victoria Libertas Pallacanestro players
21st-century African-American people
20th-century African-American sportspeople